Sinopoda is a genus of Asian huntsman spiders that was first described by Peter Jäger in 1999.<ref name=Jäge1999>{{cite journal| last=Jäger| first=P.| year=1999| title=Sinopoda, a new genus of Heteropodinae (Araneae, Sparassidae) from Asia| journal=Journal of Arachnology| pages=19–24| volume=27| author-link=Peter_Jäger}}</ref>

Species
 it contains 138 species, found in Asia:S. abstrusa Zhong, Jäger, Chen & Liu, 2019 – ChinaS. aenyk Grall & Jäger, 2020 – LaosS. aequalis Zhong, Jäger, Chen & Liu, 2019 – ChinaS. afflata Zhong, Cao & Liu, 2017 – ChinaS. albofasciata Jäger & Ono, 2002 – Japan (Ryukyu Is.)S. altissima (Hu & Li, 1987) – ChinaS. anguina Liu, Li & Jäger, 2008 – ChinaS. angulata Jäger, Gao & Fei, 2002 – ChinaS. apiculiformis Zhong, Jäger, Chen & Liu, 2019 – ChinaS. arboricola Grall & Jäger, 2020 – Malaysia (Borneo)S. assamensis Grall & Jäger, 2020 – IndiaS. aureola Kim, Lee & Lee, 2014 – KoreaS. bifurca Grall & Jäger, 2020 – ChinaS. bigibba (Chae, Lee & Kim, 2022) – KoreaS. biguttata Lee, Lee & Kim, 2016 – KoreaS. bispina Grall & Jäger, 2020 – MyanmarS. bogil (Chae, Lee & Kim, 2022) – KoreaS. brevis Zhong, Jäger, Chen & Liu, 2019 – ChinaS. caeca Grall & Jäger, 2020 – LaosS. campanacea (Wang, 1990) – ChinaS. chiangmaiensis Grall & Jäger, 2020 – ThailandS. chongan Xu, Yin & Peng, 2000 – ChinaS. cochlearia Zhang, Zhang & Zhang, 2015 – ChinaS. columnaris Zhong, Jäger, Chen & Liu, 2019 – ChinaS. cornuta Grall & Jäger, 2020 – Indonesia (Sulawesi)S. crassa Liu, Li & Jäger, 2008 – ChinaS. curva Zhong, Jäger, Chen & Liu, 2019 – ChinaS. dasani Kim, Lee, Lee & Hong, 2015 – KoreaS. dashahe Zhu, Zhang, Zhang & Chen, 2005 – ChinaS. dayong (Bao, Yin & Yan, 2000) – ChinaS. dehiscens Zhong, Jäger, Chen & Liu, 2019 – ChinaS. deminutiva Grall & Jäger, 2020 – LaosS. derivata Jäger & Ono, 2002 – JapanS. emei Grall & Jäger, 2020 – ChinaS. empat Grall & Jäger, 2020 – Malaysia (Peninsula)S. erromena Zhong, Jäger, Chen & Liu, 2019 – ChinaS. exspectata Jäger & Ono, 2001 – TaiwanS. fasciculata Jäger, Gao & Fei, 2002 – ChinaS. flexura Grall & Jäger, 2020 – Laos or Cambodia or VietnamS. forcipata (Karsch, 1881) (type) – China, Korea, JapanS. fornicata Liu, Li & Jäger, 2008 – ChinaS. globosa Zhang, Zhang & Zhang, 2015 – ChinaS. grandispinosa Liu, Li & Jäger, 2008 – ChinaS. guangyuanensis Zhong, Jäger, Chen & Liu, 2018 – ChinaS. guap Jäger, 2012 – LaosS. hainan Grall & Jäger, 2020 – China (Hainan)S. hamata (Fox, 1937) – ChinaS. hanya Grall & Jäger, 2020 – Malaysia (Borneo)S. helii Wang & Li, 2021 – ChinaS. himalayica (Hu & Li, 1987) – ChinaS. hongruii Wang & Li, 2021 – ChinaS. horizontalis Zhong, Cao & Liu, 2017 – ChinaS. improcera Zhong, Jäger, Chen & Liu, 2019 – ChinaS. insicura Grall & Jäger, 2020 – ChinaS. inthanon Grall & Jäger, 2020 – ThailandS. jiangzhou Wang & Li, 2021 – ChinaS. jirisanensis (Kim & Chae, 2013) – KoreaS. kalaw Grall & Jäger, 2020 – MyanmarS. kambaiti Grall & Jäger, 2020 – MyanmarS. kamouk Grall & Jäger, 2020 – LaosS. kieo Grall & Jäger, 2020 – LaosS. kinabalu Grall & Jäger, 2020 – Malaysia (Borneo)S. konglor Grall & Jäger, 2020 – LaosS. koreana (Paik, 1968) – Korea, JapanS. kyee Grall & Jäger, 2020 – MyanmarS. lata Zhong, Jäger, Chen & Liu, 2019 – ChinaS. lebar Grall & Jäger, 2020 – Indonesia (Sulawesi)S. licenti (Schenkel, 1953) – ChinaS. liui Zhong, Cao & Liu, 2017 – ChinaS. longicymbialis Grall & Jäger, 2020 – Thailand S. longiducta Zhang, Zhang & Zhang, 2015 – ChinaS. longshan Yin, Peng, Yan & Bao, 2000 – ChinaS. lot Grall & Jäger, 2020 – ThailandS. luyui Zhong, Jäger, Chen & Liu, 2019 – ChinaS. maculata Grall & Jäger, 2020 – Malaysia (Borneo)S. mamillata Zhong, Cao & Liu, 2017 – ChinaS. mat Grall & Jäger, 2020 – VietnamS. matang Grall & Jäger, 2020 – Malaysia (Borneo)S. mi Chen & Zhu, 2009 – ChinaS. microphthalma (Fage, 1929) – MalaysiaS. minschana (Schenkel, 1936) – ChinaS. muyuensis (Zhong, Zeng, Gu, Yu & Yang, 2022) – ChinaS. nanphagu Grall & Jäger, 2020 – MyanmarS. nigrobrunnea Lee, Lee & Kim, 2016 – KoreaS. nuda Liu, Li & Jäger, 2008 – ChinaS. ogatai Jäger & Ono, 2002 – JapanS. okinawana Jäger & Ono, 2000 – Japan (Ryukyu Is.)S. ovata Zhong, Jäger, Chen & Liu, 2019 – ChinaS. pantherina (Chae, Lee & Kim, 2022) – KoreaS. parva Grall & Jäger, 2020 – Malaysia (Peninsula)S. peet Jäger, 2012 – LaosS. pengi Song & Zhu, 1999 – ChinaS. phathai Grall & Jäger, 2020 – ThailandS. phiset Grall & Jäger, 2020 – ThailandS. phom Grall & Jäger, 2020 – ThailandS. pyramidalis Zhong, Jäger, Chen & Liu, 2019 – ChinaS. reinholdae Grall & Jäger, 2020 – Malaysia (Borneo)S. rotunda Grall & Jäger, 2020 – ChinaS. ruam Grall & Jäger, 2020 – ThailandS. saiyok Wang & Li, 2021 – ThailandS. scurion Jäger, 2012 – LaosS. semicirculata Liu, Li & Jäger, 2008 – ChinaS. separata Zhong, Cao & Liu, 2017 – ChinaS. serpentembolus Zhang, Zhu, Jäger & Song, 2007 – ChinaS. serrata (Wang, 1990) – ChinaS. shennonga (Peng, Yin & Kim, 1996) – ChinaS. silvicola Grall & Jäger, 2020 – ChinaS. sitkao Jäger, 2012 – LaosS. soong Jäger, 2012 – LaosS. steineri Jäger, 2012 – LaosS. stellata (Schenkel, 1963) – ChinaS. stellatops Jäger & Ono, 2002 – Korea, JapanS. suang Jäger, 2012 – LaosS. sulawesia Grall & Jäger, 2020 – Indonesia (Sulawesi)S. taa Jäger, 2012 – LaosS. tanikawai Jäger & Ono, 2000 – JapanS. tawau Grall & Jäger, 2020 – Malaysia (Borneo)S. tengchongensis Fu & Zhu, 2008 – ChinaS. tham Jäger, 2012 – LaosS. thieu Grall & Jäger, 2020 – VietnamS. tibang Grall & Jäger, 2020 – Indonesia (Borneo)S. tilmanni Grall & Jäger, 2020 – Malaysia (Peninsula)S. tralinh Grall & Jäger, 2020 – VietnamS. triangula Liu, Li & Jäger, 2008 – ChinaS. tuber Grall & Jäger, 2020 – Borneo (Malaysia, Brunei)S. tumefacta Zhong, Jäger, Chen & Liu, 2019 – ChinaS. undata Liu, Li & Jäger, 2008 – ChinaS. unicolor Grall & Jäger, 2020 – ThailandS. wangi Song & Zhu, 1999 – ChinaS. wayala Grall & Jäger, 2020 – ChinaS. wuyiensis Liu, 2021 – ChinaS. xieae Peng & Yin, 2001 – ChinaS. yaanensis Zhong, Jäger, Chen & Liu, 2019 – ChinaS. yanjin Wang & Li, 2021 – ChinaS. yanlingensis Zhong, Jäger, Chen & Liu, 2019 – ChinaS. yanzi Wang & Li, 2021 – ChinaS. yaojingensis Liu, Li & Jäger, 2008 – ChinaS. yichangensis Zhu, Zhong & Yang, 2020 – China

Uncataloged species
 Sinopoda scurion'' - Eyeless Huntsman Spider Founded in Laos, 2012

See also
 List of Sparassidae species

References

Araneomorphae genera
Sparassidae
Spiders of Asia